The Partridge Stakes was an American Thoroughbred horse race held annually at Sheepshead Bay Race Track from 1890 through 1909. A race on turf over a distance of six furlongs (3/4 of a mile), it was open to two-year-old horses of either sex.

Historical notes
In the 1891 Partridge Stakes Azra ran third to winner Rex but went on to win the 1892 Kentucky Derby.

The three-year-old gelding Dolly Spanker won the 1903 edition of the Partridge Stakes and went on to a long and successful career winning on both turf and dirt. A popular runner, the New York Times called Dolly Spanker "one of the best-know flat racers in the country" and had been "one of the best handicap horses on the Metropolitan tracks."

The End of a Race and of a Racetrack
The 1908 passage of the Hart–Agnew anti-betting legislation by the New York Legislature under Republican Governor Charles Evans Hughes created havoc in the state's racing industry and would lead to a compete shutdown of racing in 1911 and 1912. The owners of Sheepshead Bay Race Track, and other racing facilities in New York State, struggled to stay in business without income from betting. Racetrack operators had no choice but to drastically reduce the purse money being paid out which resulted in the Partridge Stakes offering a substantially reduced purse in 1908 with further reduction in 1909 to where it less than one-sixth of what it had been in earlier years. These small purses made horse racing unprofitable and impossible for even the most successful horse owners to continue in business. A February 21, 1913 ruling by the New York Supreme Court, Appellate Division saw horse racing return in 1913. However, it was too late for the Sheepshead Bay horse racing facility and it never reopened.

Records
Speed record:
 Ethereal @ 6 furlongs: 1:13 2/5 (1908)

Most wins by a jockey:
 3 – Fred Taral (1890, 1895, 1897)

Most wins by a trainer:
 3 – Green B. Morris (1890, 1891, 1899)

Most wins by an owner:
 3 – Green B. Morris (1890, 1891, 1899)

Winners

References

Discontinued horse races in New York City
Flat horse races for two-year-olds
Turf races in the United States
Open sprint category horse races
Sheepshead Bay Race Track
Recurring sporting events established in 1890
Recurring sporting events disestablished in 1909